Reincarnation is a William C. Woxlin album released in 2006. It was meant to be released on January 21 but was pushed forward to 29th. But after a press message William C. Woxlin said: "Since I like my music to be perfect I had to make some new tracks and take away some old".

On the question about the release date William answered: "Maybe... tomorrow, maybe next month or maybe this summer"

It was later released in April.

Track listing
 "Post Inferno Voices" – 4:20
 "Relinquish" – 3:06
 "Quiescent" – 5:04
 "The Qualm Before the Day of Retribution" – 3:52
 "Inscrutable Inhumation of the Apocalypse" – 4:48
 "Siberia" – 2:51
 "Path of Our Hearse" – 3:40
 "Hugeness of the Metamorphosis" – 4:26
 "Misinterpretion of Death" – 3:49
 "The Parricide" – 3:52
 "Voice of Respiration" – 3:00
 "Post Inferno" – 12:19

2006 albums
William C. Woxlin albums